Bryaan Ross, also known as CJ Mac (Born in March 26, 1964) is an American rapper and actor.

Music career
He released his debut EP, Color Me Funky, independently in 1991, under the name "CJ Mack." The album is out of print, and extremely rare. He returned in 1995 and released his second album, True Game on Rap-A-Lot Records, in 1995 with producer Mad. He was originally going to release the album through Ruthless Records.

He appeared in the movie Thicker than Water with Mack 10 and Fat Joe, where he played a drug lord called Gator.

His third album, Platinum Game, featured various west coast rappers and peaked at 77 Top R&B/Hip-hop albums.

CJ Mac also directed a documentary called On the C-Walk. He is also known for working with Death Row Records in late 2000 with his song "I Ain't Fuccin Wit' Cha" (from Too Gangsta for Radio), in which he insulted Dr. Dre for leaving the label and declaring gangsta rap dead, as well as artists Hittman, Eminem, Snoop Dogg and Aftermath Records. CJ Mac is also known for collaborating with artists C-Bo, Yukmouth, Dresta, Poppa LQ, Mack 10, Techniec, Scarface and WC.

Cj Mac was featured on a No Jumper interview, a podcast on the internet released May 15, 2016.

Discography

Studio albums 
True Game (1995)
Platinum Game (1999)

Extended plays 
Color Me Funky (1991)

References

1964 births
Living people
21st-century American rappers
African-American male actors
African-American rappers
American male film actors
Crips
Death Row Records artists
Gangsta rappers
G-funk artists
Male actors from Los Angeles
Rap-A-Lot Records artists
Rappers from Los Angeles
Ruthless Records artists
West Coast hip hop musicians